A statue of Agustín de la Rosa is installed along the Rotonda de los Jaliscienses Ilustres in Centro, Guadalajara, in the Mexican state of Jalisco.

References

External links

 

Outdoor sculptures in Guadalajara
Rotonda de los Jaliscienses Ilustres
Sculptures of men in Mexico
Statues in Jalisco